Roedean School for Girls is a private English medium and boarding school for girls situated in the suburb of Parktown in the city of  Johannesburg in the  Gauteng province of South Africa.

History
The school was founded in 1903 by Theresa Lawrence and, Katherine Margaret Earle: two young women in their early thirties, both educated at the University of Cambridge. They acted as joint Heads of School during the years 1903–1930. It is a sister school of Roedean School in Brighton, England which was founded by three older sisters of Theresa Lawrence, namely Penelope, Millicent, and Dorothy.

The school began with 22 pupils, and was situated in a small house in Jeppestown, Johannesburg. In 1904, it relocated to its current site in Parktown, Johannesburg.
 
Sir Herbert Baker, a prominent architect responsible for many of Johannesburg's most historical houses and monuments, designed the original school buildings. The oldest structures include St. Ursula's Building and Founder's Hall. Over the years, additions have been made, but the signature Herbert Baker features, with arches, colonnades, unwashed brickwork, and courtyards have been maintained.

Notable alumnae

Mary Maytham Kidd, botanical artist 
Sheena Duncan, social activist 
Jani Allan
Camilla Waldman, actress
Maud Sumner, artist
Lauren Beukes, author
Jillian Becker, writer
Sarah Calburn, architect
Kate Otten, architect
Rapelang Rabana, entrepreneur

Academics
Roedean's leavers write the Independent Examinations Board exams.

See also 
List of boarding schools

References

External links

Anglican schools in South Africa
Girls' schools in South Africa
Schools in Johannesburg
Boarding schools in South Africa
Private schools in Gauteng
Educational institutions established in 1903
1903 establishments in Transvaal Colony
Herbert Baker buildings and structures